Anirudh Khotkar is an Indian politician and Shiv Sena leader from Jalna district, Marathwada region of Maharashtra. 
He is elected as President of Zilla Parishad ( District Pnachayat) of Jalna as Shiv Sena candidate. He had served as President of Zilla Parishad for 3 times and Deputy President for 2 terms.
Anirudh Khotkar has been elected to as Member of Jalna Zilla Parishad for six consecutive terms which is a record.

Positions held
 1992: Elected as Member of Jalna Zilla Parishad (1st term)
 1997: Elected as Member of Jalna Zilla Parishad (2nd term)
 2002: Elected as Member of Jalna Zilla Parishad (3rd term)
 2007: Elected as Member of Jalna Zilla Parishad (4th term)
 2012: Elected as Member of Jalna Zilla Parishad (5th term) 
 2014: Elected as a Deputy President  of Jalna Zilla Parishad 
 2017: Elected as Member of Jalna Zilla Parishad (6th term)
 2017: Elected as a President  of Jalna Zilla Parishad

References

External links
 Shiv Sena official website
 Zilla Parishad, Jalna

Living people
21st-century Indian politicians
Shiv Sena politicians
People from Jalna district
Marathi politicians
Year of birth missing (living people)